London Buses route 12 is a Transport for London contracted bus route in London, England. Running between Dulwich Library and Oxford Circus, it is operated by London Central.

History

The route is one of the oldest in London, going back to at least 1851, along with the routes 9 and 11.
In February 1907, the first bus produced by British Automobile Development Co. and Brush Electrical Engineering Co. Ltd. went into service on this route. Tilling-Stevens petrol electric buses were used on route 12, running between Oxford Circus and Peckham. In the 1930s destinations between South Croydon and Brent Cross station were served. By the 1950s, the route operated between South Croydon and Willesden Junction, although buses from Croydon generally ran no further than Oxford Circus and those from Harlesden no further than Dulwich.

The route has been run from a number of garages. The computer scheduling system developed by London Buses in the 1970s is designed for a maximum of four garages operating on any one route; this was derived from route 12, which had four garages operating vehicles on it at the time. During the annual Notting Hill Carnival express services operated as 12X.

Route 12 was shortened to terminate at Norwood Junction in 1972, with new route 12A (later 312 and now 197) taking over between South Croydon and Peckham. On 25 October 1986, the route was reduced to operate only between Penge and East Acton. From 14 August 1988, route 12 was curtailed south of Dulwich Library, capacity being maintained by extending route 78 from Dulwich to Forest Hill and route 176 from Forest Hill to Penge. The western terminal was cut back to Shepherd's Bush on 13 July 1991 and to Notting Hill Gate on 12 March 1994.

The route was operated by AEC Regent III RTs until replaced by AEC Routemasters in 1973.

The route was restructured on 5 November 2004, with the section between Oxford Circus and Notting Hill Gate withdrawn, with route 390 extended. At the same time the Routemasters were replaced by Mercedes-Benz O530G articulated buses.

Free WiFi and passenger information screens were introduced in August 2014 on two buses as part of a trial by Transport for London.

Wright Eclipse Gemini 2 bodied Volvo B9TL and Wright Eclipse Gemini 2 bodied Volvo B5LH double deck buses were introduced on 24 November 2011 as part of the Mayor of London's policy to withdraw articulated buses from London.

London Central has successfully retained route 12 with new contracts starting on 6 November 2004 and 5 December 2011.

New Routemasters were introduced on 28 March 2015. The rear platform remains closed at all times except for when the bus is at bus stops.

Current route
Route 12 operates via these primary locations:
Dulwich Library
East Dulwich Underhill Road
Peckham Rye Barry Road
Peckham Rye station  
Peckham High Street
Camberwell Green
Walworth Road
Elephant & Castle station  
Imperial War Museum St George's Street
St George's Circus
Lambeth North station 
Lower Marsh
St Thomas' Hospital / County Hall
Westminster Bridge
Westminster station 
Whitehall
Trafalgar Square for Charing Cross station  
Haymarket
Piccadilly Circus station 
Soho Conduit Street Hamleys
Regent Street
Oxford Circus station 
Oxford Circus Margaret Street

Cultural significance
The route passes a number of tourist attractions and landmarks and has been suggested as part of a cheaper alternative to formal bus tours of London.
 Between the stops by Sandi Toksvig is sub-titled The view of My Life from the top of The Number 12 Bus.

References

External links

Timetable

Bus routes in London
Transport in the London Borough of Lambeth
Transport in the London Borough of Southwark
Transport in the City of Westminster